La verità in cimento (Truth in Contention) is an opera by Antonio Vivaldi to a libretto by Giovanni Palazzi. The opera, Vivaldi's 13th, was premiered during the Carnival at Venice in 1720. The work is dedicated to Count Sava Vladislavich, a Serbian merchant and diplomat in the employ of Peter the Great, who resided in Venice from 1716 to 1722. The work is listed as RV 739 in the Vivaldi catalogue.

Roles

Synopsis
Mamud had two sons, one by his favourite Damira and one by the Sultana Rustena. He had them exchanged at birth, so that Melindo, in truth the son of Damira, is thought to be the legitimate heir, a position rightfully held by Zelim. When marriage is proposed between Melindo and Rosane, the heiress to another Sultanate (who is in fact beloved by Zelim), Mamud resolves to reveal the true state of affairs. After various twists and turns, Zelim inherits the larger portion of his empire, while Melindo contents himself with a secondary kingdom (Rosane's country) and is allowed to marry the fickle princess Rosane. This leaves everyone satisfied.

Recording
Ensemble Matheus, cond. Jean-Christophe Spinosi (2002)
Vivaldi: Arie ritrovate, Sofia Prina, Accademia Bizantina, Ottavio Dantone. Naive. (2008)

References

Frédéric Delaméa, tr. Charles Johnston, essays in booklet accompanying recording referred to above.

Operas
1720 operas
Operas by Antonio Vivaldi
Italian-language operas